Deh-e Ali Ahmad-e Lek Zahi (also Romanized as Deh-e ‘Alī Aḩmad-e Lek Zahī; also known as ‘Alī Aḩmad and Deh-e ‘Alī Aḩmad-e Malek Zahī) is a village in Qorqori Rural District, Qorqori District, Hirmand County, Sistan and Baluchestan Province, Iran. At the 2006 census, its population was 90, in 15 families.

References 

Populated places in Hirmand County